Hermann Strutz (born 2 December 1938) is an Austrian speed skater. He competed at the 1960 Winter Olympics, the 1964 Winter Olympics and the 1968 Winter Olympics.

References

1938 births
Living people
Austrian male speed skaters
Olympic speed skaters of Austria
Speed skaters at the 1960 Winter Olympics
Speed skaters at the 1964 Winter Olympics
Speed skaters at the 1968 Winter Olympics
Sportspeople from Styria
People from Südoststeiermark District